Shawn Michael O'Malley (born December 28, 1987) is an American former professional baseball utility player. He played in Major League Baseball (MLB) for the Los Angeles Angels of Anaheim and Seattle Mariners.

Career

High school 
O'Malley helped lead Southridge High School to the 2003-2004 Washington State 4A Baseball Title. O'Malley received all-state honors in football and baseball. He committed to play baseball at Washington State University.

Tampa Bay Rays 
O'Malley was drafted by the Tampa Bay Devil Rays in the fifth round of the 2006 Major League Baseball Draft (139th overall) out of Southridge High School in Kennewick, Washington. He played in the Devil Rays/Rays organization until 2013 without reaching the majors.

Los Angeles Angels of Anaheim 
Before the 2014 season he signed a minor league deal with the Los Angeles Angels of Anaheim.

O'Malley was called up to the majors for the first time on September 1, 2014. He made his major league debut on September 7, 2014, when he pinch-hit for Albert Pujols at Minnesota against Twins pitcher Ryan Pressly, reaching on an infield hit to shortstop which drove in a run. O'Malley was released by the Angels on December 19, 2014.

Seattle Mariners 
O'Malley was signed by the Seattle Mariners to a minor league contract with an invite to Major League spring training on January 22, 2015. While batting .345 at triple-A with the Tacoma Rainiers, he was hindered from getting promoted due to a wrist injury, until rosters expanded. The Mariners promoted him to the major leagues on September 1, 2015.

In his first game with the Mariners, he went 3 for 4 with three singles, two RBIs, and a stolen base in an 8-3 win over the Houston Astros. O'Malley finished the 2015 season batting .262 with Seattle.

Despite a very successful Spring Training, batting .471 (16-for-34) in 21 games, O'Malley was optioned to Triple-A Tacoma to begin the 2016 season.

O'Malley was recalled by the Mariners on May 15, 2016, after batting .317 in 25 games with the Tacoma Rainiers.

On June 2, 2016, O'Malley played a vital role in the Mariners biggest comeback in club history. He drove in the game winning run with an RBI single. He missed the entire 2017 season due to injury. He elected free agency on November 6, 2017.

Colorado Rockies
On December 16, 2017, O'Malley signed a minor league contract with the Colorado Rockies. He elected free agency on November 3, 2018.

Kansas City T-Bones
On February 27, 2019, O'Malley signed with the Kansas City T-Bones of the independent American Association. He retired from professional baseball following the season.

Coaching career
O'Malley was announced as hitting coach for the Modesto Nuts, Class-A Advanced affiliate of the Seattle Mariners, for the 2020 season.

Awards 
 Florida State League Player of the Week (July 20–26, 2009)
 Florida State League Post-Season All-Star (2009)
 Pacific Coast League All-Star (2014)
 MiLB.com Organization All-Star (2014)

References

External links

1987 births
Living people
People from Richland, Washington
Baseball players from Washington (state)
Major League Baseball infielders
Los Angeles Angels players
Seattle Mariners players
Princeton Devil Rays players
Hudson Valley Renegades players
Columbus Catfish players
Charlotte Stone Crabs players
Phoenix Desert Dogs players
Montgomery Biscuits players
Gulf Coast Rays players
Durham Bulls players
Arkansas Travelers players
Salt Lake Bees players
Arizona League Angels players
Tacoma Rainiers players
Everett AquaSox players
Arizona League Mariners players
Albuquerque Isotopes players
Kansas City T-Bones players